Freedom on Fire: Ukraine’s Fight for Freedom is a 2022 Ukrainian -British-American documentary film written and directed by Evgeny Afineevsky. It premiered out of competition at the 79th edition of the Venice Film Festival.

Plot
The film chronicles the early stages of the 2022 Russian invasion of Ukraine, from the point of view of Ukrainian ordinary citizens.

Release
The film had its world premiere at the 79th Venice International Film Festival. It was later screened at various festivals, including the 47th Toronto Film Festival, the Tokyo International Film Festival, the Seattle International Film Festival, the Stockholm International Film Festival. It was released theatrically in the U.S. by MakeMake Entertainment on November 25, 2022.

Reception
The film was generally praised by critics. Screen International critic Jonathan Romney described it as "a film that deserves to be widely seen, and as soon as possible". According to Los Angeles Times critic Robert Abele, the film is a "pulsating jumble of hearts and minds making do amid war and wreckage".  According to TheWrap review, "the film is less a catalogue of horrors than a tribute to the people who look for strength despite those horrors; it continually finds moments of grace, humanity and even beauty that seem almost unfathomable in these circumstances."

See also
 Winter on Fire: Ukraine's Fight for Freedom

References

External links
 
 
2022 documentary films
Ukrainian documentary films
British documentary films   
American documentary films
Films directed by Evgeny Afineevsky
Documentary films about Ukraine
Russo-Ukrainian War films
Ukrainian-language films